The 1840 United States presidential election in Louisiana took place between October 30 and December 2, 1840, as part of the 1840 United States presidential election. Voters chose five representatives, or electors to the Electoral College, who voted for President and Vice President.

Louisiana voted for the Whig candidate, William Henry Harrison, over Democratic candidate Martin Van Buren. Harrison won Louisiana by a margin of 19.46%.

With 59.73% of the popular vote, Louisiana would prove to be Harrison's fourth strongest state after Kentucky, Vermont and Rhode Island.

Results

See also
 United States presidential elections in Louisiana

References

Louisiana
1840
1840 Louisiana elections